Shikaripura Ranganatha Rao (1 July 1922 – 3 January 2013), commonly known as Dr. S. R. Rao, was an Indian archaeologist who led teams credited with  discoveries of a number of Harappan sites including the port city Lothal and Bet Dwarka in Gujarat.

Biography and career 
Rao was born on 1 July 1922 into a Madhwa Brahmin family. He completed his education from Mysore University. He worked in the Archaeological Department of Baroda State and subsequently served the Archaeological Survey of India in various capacities. Rao has led excavations of many important sites such as Rangpur, Amreli, Bhagatrav, Dwarka, Hanur, Aihole, Kaveripattinam and others. One of his most important works were leading the research and excavations at Lothal, the earliest known port in history and the most important Indus-era site in India. Rao was the recipient of Jawaharlal Nehru Fellowship and a doctorate of literature from Mysore University. Rao had supervised excavation of several historic sites across the country in the West and South.

He was also associated with conservation of monuments such as Taj Mahal and forts. Despite officially retiring in 1980 Rao was requested to work for the ASI Director General in leading Indian archaeological projects. It was under Rao's initiative that the NIO opened a marine archaeology research centre in 1981, under the stewardship of then director Syed Zahoor Qasim, which grew into a world recognised body. He was the founder of the Society of Marine Archaeology in India. Rao has been at the forefront of Indian archaeology for many decades - he was involved in extensive research into India's ancient past, from the sites of the Indus Valley civilization to excavations pertaining to the Kurukshetra War.

Indus script decipherment claim 
Rao (1992) claimed to have deciphered the  Indus script. Postulating  uniformity of the script over the full extent of Indus-era civilization, he compared it to the Phoenician Alphabet, and assigned sound values based on this comparison. His decipherment results in an "Sanskritic" reading, including the numerals aeka, tra, chatus, panta, happta/sapta, dasa, dvadasa, sata (1, 3, 4, 5, 7, 10, 12, 100).

While mainstream scholarship is generally in agreement with  Rao's approach of comparison, the details of his decipherment have not been accepted, and the script is still generally considered undeciphered. John E. Mitchiner, after dismissing some more fanciful attempts at decipherment, mentions that "a more soundly-based but still greatly subjective and unconvincing attempt to discern an Indo-European basis in the script has been that of Rao".

In a 2002 interview with The Hindu, Rao asserted his faith in his decipherment, saying that "Recently we have confirmed that it is definitely an Indo-Aryan language and deciphered. Prof. W. W. De Grummond of Florida State University has written in his article that I have already deciphered it."

Identification of Dwarka 

Dating of pottery found here gave a date of 1528 BCE based on thermoluminescence dating Further unearthed was a seal. Rao asserted the three-holed triangular stone anchors found in large numbers in Dwarka waters suggested a continuity in evolution of the anchors in Lothal and Mohenjodaro, which had a single hole, and that the Dwarka anchors of late Harappan phase are a couple of centuries older than the identical anchors of late Bronze Age used in Cyprus and Syria. However, later on the NIO dated the stone anchors to be of fourteenth century of Common Era. It also stated that similar such anchors have been found in other old ports of India.

Rao asserts that the unearthed remains at Dwarka were the historical city that was home to Krishna, believed to be the eighth Avatar of Vishnu. According to  the Mahabharata, Krishna built Dwarka at Kushasthali—a fortress in the sea which is currently in ruins. Then he built another city at the mouth of the Gomti River. The Mahabharata also refers to how Krishna wanted every citizen to carry some sort of identity—a mudra.

Publications
 Lothal and the Indus Civilisation, Bombay: Asia Publishing House,  (1973)
 Lothal: A Harappan Port Town (1955 - 1962), Vols. I and II, Memoirs of the Archaeological Survey of India, no.78, New Delhi, ASIN: B0006E4EAC (1979 and 1985)
 Lothal, New Delhi: the Director General, Archaeological Survey of India (1985)
 Dawn and Devolution of the Indus Civilization, Delhi: Aditya Prakashan (1991)
 New Trends in Indian Art and Archaeology: S.R. Rao's 70th Birthday Felicitation Volumes, edited by B.U. Nayak and N.C. Ghosh, 2 vols. (1992)
 New Frontiers of Archaeology, Bombay: Popular Prakashan,  (1994)
 The Lost City of Dvaraka, National Institute of Oceanography,  (1999)
 Marine Archaeology in India, Delhi: Publications Division,  (2001)

References

External links 

Dr. Rao emphasizes preservation of heritage sites in India
Indus script
Hindu dated 20 Feb 2006 - S. R. Rao among Vidya Varenya awardees

Rao biography

Interview
Portrait of S.R.Rao at Kamat.com
S.R.Rao's speech(mp3)about Lord Krishna's Dwarka at DeshGujarat.Com

1922 births
2013 deaths
People from Shimoga district
Kannada people
20th-century Indian archaeologists
Underwater archaeologists
Indigenous Aryanists
People associated with the Indus Valley civilisation
Scientists from Karnataka
Jawaharlal Nehru Fellows
Madhva Brahmins
Archaeologists of South Asia